Archer is the name of various ships:

 , a submarine of the Republic of Singapore, first ship in the Archer-class submarine
 , various ships of the British Royal Navy named "Archer"
 , an Attack-class patrol boat of the Royal Australian Navy
 , a Confederate States of America commerce raider
 , a Republic of Texas brig
 , a United States Navy escort carrier

See also
 Daisy Archer, a Maryland Fisheries Force and Navy patrol boat
 , a British Empire-class cargo ship
 Archer class (disambiguation), various ship classes
 Archer (disambiguation)

Ship names